The Bezirksliga Württemberg-Baden was the highest association football league in the German states of Württemberg and Baden and the Prussian Province of Hohenzollern from 1923 to 1933. The league was disbanded with the rise of the Nazis to power in 1933.

Overview
The league was formed in 1923, after a league reform which was decided upon in Darmstadt, Hesse. It replaced the Kreisliga Südwest and the Kreisliga Württemberg as the highest leagues in the region.

The league started out with eight clubs from the two states and the Prussian province in the region, but without clubs from the Ulm, who were playing in the Bezirksliga Bayern and Mannheim, who played in the Bezirksliga Rhein instead. The eight clubs played each other in a home-and-away round with the top team advancing to the Southern German championship, which in turn was a qualification tournament for the German championship.

For the second and third seasons, 1924–25 and 1925–26, the modus remained unchanged.

For the 1926-27 season, the league was expanded to ten teams. The top team was again qualified for the finals. The runners-up of the Bezirksligas in the south from then on also played a championship round to determine a third team from the region to go to the German finals with the Karlsruher FV from the region qualifying for this.

After this season, the league was split into a Württemberg and a Baden group, the first having nine and the second eight teams. No final was played between the two group winners as both went on to the Southern German championship. The second and third placed team of each division would also advance to the separate round of the runners-up like in the previous season.

The 1928-29 season saw no change in modus but both leagues now operated on a strength of eight clubs. The qualification system for the finals also remained unchanged. This system remained in place until 1931.

For the 1931-32 season, both divisions were expanded to ten teams. The top-two teams from each league then advanced to the Southern German finals, which were now staged in two regional groups with a finals game between the two group winners at the end. The same system applied for the final season of the league in 1932-33.

With the rise of the Nazis to power, the Gauligas were introduced as the highest football leagues in Germany. In Württemberg-Baden, the Gauliga Württemberg and the Gauliga Baden replaced the Bezirksliga as the highest level of play.

National success
The clubs from the Bezirksliga Württemberg-Baden did not manage to win a German championship in this era and were dominated by the much stronger competition from the Bezirksliga Bayern.

Southern German championship
 1924:
 Stuttgarter Kickers, 3rd place
 1925:
 Stuttgarter Kickers, 4th place
 1926:
 Karlsruher FV, 6th place
 1927:
 Karlsruher FV, 2nd place in the Bezirksliga-runners-up round
 VfB Stuttgart, 5th place
 1928:
 Phönix Karlsruhe, 8th place in the Bezirksliga-runners-up round southwest division
 Union Böckingen, 6th place in the Bezirksliga-runners-up round southwest division
 SC Freiburg, 5th place in the Bezirksliga-runners-up round southwest division
 VfB Stuttgart, 4th place in the Bezirksliga-runners-up round southwest division
 Stuttgarter Kickers, 5th place
 Karlsruher FV, 4th place
 1929:
 Freiburger FC, 8th place in the Bezirksliga-runners-up round southwest division
 Phönix Karlsruhe, 6th place in the Bezirksliga-runners-up round southwest division
 VfB Stuttgart, 5th place in the Bezirksliga-runners-up round southwest division
 Stuttgarter Kickers, 4th place in the Bezirksliga-runners-up round southwest division
 Germania Brötzingen, 6th place
 Karlsruher FV, 5th place
 1930:
 Union Böckingen, 8th place in the Bezirksliga-runners-up round southwest division
 Phönix Karlsruhe, 7th place in the Bezirksliga-runners-up round southwest division
 Karlsruher FV, 4th place in the Bezirksliga-runners-up round southwest division
 VfR Heilbronn, 3rd place in the Bezirksliga-runners-up round southwest division
 Freiburger FC, 8th place
 VfB Stuttgart, 5th place
 1931:
 Phönix Karlsruhe, 8th place in the Bezirksliga-runners-up round southwest division
 FV Rastatt, 7th place in the Bezirksliga-runners-up round southwest division
 Stuttgarter Kickers, 5th place in the Bezirksliga-runners-up round southwest division
 1. FC Pforzheim, 4th place in the Bezirksliga-runners-up round southwest division
 Union Böckingen, 8th place
 Karlsruher FV, 5th place
 1932:
 VfB Stuttgart, 8th place southwest division
 FV Rastatt, 7th place southwest division
 1. FC Pforzheim, 4th place southwest division
 Karlsruher FV, 3rd place southwest division
 1933:
 Union Böckingen, 8th place northsouth division
 Phönix Karlsruhe, 6th place northsouth division
 Karlsruher FV, 5th place northsouth division
 Stuttgarter Kickers, 4th place northsouth division

German championship
No team from the region qualified for the German championship finals in this era.

Founding members of the league
 Stuttgarter Kickers  
 Freiburger FC  
 1. FC Pforzheim 
 Stuttgarter SC 
 VfR Heilbronn 
 FC Mühlburg 
 SV Feuerbach 
 Phönix Karlsruhe

Winners and runners-up of the Bezirksliga Württemberg-Baden

Placings in the Bezirksliga Württemberg-Baden 1923-33

Clubs from Baden-division

Source:

Clubs from the Württemberg-division

Source:

References

Sources
 Fussball-Jahrbuch Deutschland  (8 vol.), Tables and results of the German tier-one leagues 1919-33, publisher: DSFS
 Kicker Almanach,  The yearbook on German football from Bundesliga to Oberliga, since 1937, published by the Kicker Sports Magazine
 Süddeutschlands Fussballgeschichte in Tabellenform 1897-1988  History of Southern German football in tables, publisher & author: Ludolf Hyll

External links
 The Gauligas  Das Deutsche Fussball Archiv 
 German league tables 1892-1933  Hirschi's Fussball seiten
 Germany - Championships 1902-1945 at RSSSF.com

1
1923 establishments in Germany
1933 disestablishments in Germany
Football competitions in Baden-Württemberg
Southern German football championship